Jean-Pierre Thiollet (born 9 December 1956) is a French writer and journalist.

Primarily living in Paris, he is the author of numerous books and one of the national leaders of the European Confederation of Independent Trade Unions (CEDI), a European employers' organization.

Career 

He attended school in Châtellerault, before his studies in Poitiers classes préparatoires aux grandes écoles and his degrees in Parisian universities (Pantheon-Sorbonne University, University of Paris III:Sorbonne Nouvelle, Paris-Sorbonne University).

In 1978, he was admitted to Saint-Cyr (Coëtquidan).

During the 1980s and till the mid-1990s, he was a member of a French Press organization for Music-hall, Circus, Dance and Arts presided by a well known journalist in France, Jacqueline Cartier, with authors or notable personalities as Pierre Cardin, Guy des Cars, and Francis Fehr.

From 1982 to 1986, he was victim of illegal wiretaps (organized by the French President François Mitterrand), for his telephone conversations with the French writer and polemist Jean-Edern Hallier.

At the end of the 1980s, he was known too as vice-president of Amiic (World Real Estate Investment Organization, Geneva) and was a lecturer, with Pierre Salinger, François Spoerry, Paul-Loup Sulitzer and other important people, of some international meetings of this organization (vanished in 1997).

At the beginning of the 1990s, he was, with Gilbert Prouteau, one of the renowned writers and art critics of a French magazine, L'Amateur d'Art.

From 1988 to 1994, he was editor-in-chief for Le Quotidien de Paris (Daily Press Group, director Philippe Tesson ).

In 1994, he was the author allowed to interview Gérard Mulliez, one of the wealthiest and powerful people in France, for the book The Customer Driven Company — Moving from Talk to Action (translated in French as La Dynamique du client) by Richard C. Whiteley.

In 1997, he played a discreet but influential role in the parliamentary election in Toulon as communications director and member of the Mayor's Cabinet. He was arbitrarily dismissed the morning after the successful poll and then published Le Chevallier à découvert (Laurens, Paris), a strongly suggestive and humorous book some months later. In 1997 too, he was, with Émile Gardaz, among the personalities when the township of Delphi appointed the renowned environmentalist Franz Weber a Citoyen d'honneur.

In 1999, he co-produced Studies (Chopin) recorded by Radoslav Kvapil. From 1999 to 2001, he was the Company Secretary of Mea Publications Limited (United Kingdom) producing the print and online versions of Ici Londres magazine.

Along with Alain Decaux, Frédéric Beigbeder and Richard Millet, he was, one of the guest writers at the 2005 Beirut Book Fair (BIEL) for Je m'appelle Byblos (My Name Is Byblos).

In April 2006, he was directly concerned with the business resumption of France-Soir, but the entrepreneur Jean-Pierre Brunois was finally chosen by the Commercial Court of Lille.

Since 2007, he has been a member of the World Grand Family of Lebanon (RJ Lebanon Club).

In 2009, Thiollet signed a petition in support of the film director Roman Polanski, calling for his release after Polanski was arrested in Switzerland in relation to his 1977 charge for drugging and raping a 13-year-old girl.

From 2009 to 2012, he worked as one of the France-Soir editors.

In October 2016, after dedicating a book about Jean-Edern Hallier to "the youth native from Euroland, zone F, victim of an old criminal political ruling class", he denounced in an interview "the French crime, committed by a political class, from the left as from the right".

His wife, Monique Thiollet, head principal, is a candidate in the municipal election of 15 and 22 March 2020 in Châtellerault. on the list led by David Simon, supported by La République en marche

Partial bibliography 
 Hallier en roue libre, with texts by François Roboth, Neva Editions, 2022.
 Hallier, L'Edernel retour, with texts by François Roboth, Neva Editions, 2021.
 Hallier, L'Homme debout, with texts by François Roboth, Neva Editions, 2020.
 Hallier Edernellement vôtre, with texts by Isabelle Coutant-Peyre and François Roboth, Neva Editions, 2019. 
 Hallier ou l'Edernité en marche, with text by François Roboth, Neva Editions, 2018. 
 Improvisation so piano, with texts by Bruno Belthoise, Jean-Louis Lemarchand and François Roboth, Neva éditions, Paris, 2017. 
 Hallier, l'Edernel jeune homme, with texts by Gabriel Enkiri and François Roboth, Neva éditions, Paris, 2016. 
 88 notes pour piano solo, with texts by Anne-Élisabeth Blateau, Jean-Louis Lemarchand and François Roboth, Neva éditions, Paris, 2015. 
 Piano ma non solo, with testimonial narratives from Jean-Marie Adrien, Mourad Amirkhanian alias Adam Barro, Florence Delaage, Caroline Dumas, Virginie Garandeau, Jean-Luc Kandyoti, Frédérique Lagarde, Genc Tukiçi and texts by Daniel Chocron, Jean-Louis Lemarchand and François Roboth, Anagramme éditions, Paris, 2012. 
 Créer ou reprendre un commerce (Create or take over a business), Vuibert Ed., Paris, 2011 (3rd ed). 
 Bodream ou rêve de Bodrum, Anagramme Ed., Paris, 2010. 
 Carré d'Art: Barbey d'Aurevilly, Lord Byron, Salvador Dalí, Jean-Edern Hallier, with texts by Anne-Élisabeth Blateau and François Roboth, Anagramme Ed., Paris, 2008. 
 Les Risques du manager, with A. Kibarian, Vuibert Ed., Paris, 2008. 
 La Fiscalité immobilière pour tous (Property taxation for all), Vuibert Ed, Paris, 20017.
 Barbey d'Aurevilly, with texts by Eugen Drewermann, Jean-Louis Christ and Bruno Bontempelli, H & D, 2006 and 2007. With CDRom. 
 Le Droit au bonheur (Right to happiness), Anagramme Ed., Paris, 2006. 
 Je m'appelle Byblos, foreword by Guy Gay-Para, H & D, 2005. 
 Sax, Mule & Co, H & D, 2004. 
 Foreword to Willy, Colette et moi  by Sylvain Bonmariage, Anagramme Ed., 2004 (reprint). 
 Demain 2021 — Jean-Claude Martinez (book-length interview), G. de Bouillon, 2004. 
 Les Dessous d'une Présidence, Anagramme Ed., 2002. 
 Beau linge et argent sale – Fraude fiscale internationale et blanchiment des capitaux (Tax Avoidance, Tax Evasion and Money Laundering), Anagramme Ed., 2002, .
 Bien préparer son départ à la retraite (Pensions in France), Vuibert Ed., 2002. 
 La Pensée unique, collective work (with Jean Foyer), Economica/J. M. Chardon & D. Lensel Ed., 1998. 
 Vitamines & Minéraux, Anagramme Ed., 2001. 
 Les baux sans peine (The leases without penalty), Axiome Ed., 1999. 
 La Vie plurielle (Conjugal life. Types of union in the new legislative arena : information for all on their advantages and disadvantages), Axiome Ed., 1999. 
 Le Chevallier à découvert, Laurens Ed., 1998. 
 Euro-CV, Top Ed., 1997. 
 L'Anti-Crise, with M-F Guignard, Dunod, 1994. 
 Os très primeiros meses num novo emprego, with M-F Guignard, transl. Maria Mello, Biblioteca do desenvolivemento pessoal, Mem Martins, 1993.  (Réussir ses trois premiers mois dans un nouveau poste, Nathan, Paris, 1992. )
 Utrillo, collective work, F. Birr Ed., 1982.

References 

1956 births
Living people
French art critics
French male non-fiction writers
20th-century French essayists
21st-century French essayists
Sorbonne Nouvelle University Paris 3 alumni
People from Poitiers